is a professional Japanese baseball player who is currently a free agent.

External links

 NPB.com

1986 births
Living people
Baseball people from Osaka Prefecture
Japanese expatriate baseball players in the United States
Lancaster Barnstormers players
Nippon Professional Baseball pitchers
Yokohama BayStars players
Yokohama DeNA BayStars players
Tohoku Rakuten Golden Eagles players
People from Sakai, Osaka